Steven Michael Davis (born December 30, 1953) is a former right-handed infielder in Major League Baseball for the Chicago Cubs.

Davis was drafted by the Cubs at age 21, in the 14th round of the 1976 June amateur draft, out of Stanford University. He did not make his professional debut until 1978, when the Cubs assigned him to AAA Wichita. He played the entirety of the 1978 and 1979 Syracuse seasons and earned a late season call-up to the Cubs in 1979. Davis made his major league debut as a defensive replacement for Mick Kelleher in the ninth inning of 6-0 Cubs loss to the Pittsburgh Pirates on September 23. He had an assist on a groundout but did not bat.

On September 25, Davis got the only at-bats of his major league career, playing the entire second game of a doubleheader against the New York Mets at third base. In his first at-bat, he grounded out, but Dave Kingman scored on the play, earning Davis the only RBI of his career. He ended up 0-for-4 on the day. Davis made one more appearance on September 30, but only appeared in the field as a second baseman.

Davis signed with the Toronto Blue Jays organization in the off-season and spent the 1980 and 1981 seasons with the Syracuse Chiefs before retiring from baseball.

External links
, or Retrosheet
Pelota Binaria (Venezuelan Winter League)

1953 births
Living people
Baseball players from Oakland, California
Cardenales de Lara players
American expatriate baseball players in Venezuela
Chicago Cubs players
Gulf Coast Cubs players
Major League Baseball second basemen
Major League Baseball third basemen
Midland Cubs players
Stanford Cardinal baseball players
Syracuse Chiefs players
Wichita Aeros players
Anchorage Glacier Pilots players